Maurene Goo is an American author of young adult fiction and comics. Her books have been translated into twelve languages and two of her novels, I Believe in a Thing Called Love and Somewhere Only We Know, have been optioned to be made into feature films by Netflix.

Life and education 
Maurene Goo was born in Los Angeles and raised in Glendale, California. She studied communication and English literature at UC San Diego. She has a master's in publishing, writing, and literature from Emerson College. Prior to publishing her debut novel, Since You Asked, she worked in publishing and design.

Career
Goo published her first young adult novel, Since You Asked, in 2013 with Scholastic. Her sophomore novel, I Believe in A Thing Called Love, was released in 2017, followed by The Way You Make Me Feel (2018), and Somewhere Only We Know (2019). In 2021, Goo completed a five-issue run for Marvel Comics, writing Korean-American superhero Silk, illustrated by Canadian comic book artist Takeshi Miyazawa who has previously illustrated other comics set in the Spider-Verse. She has published essays and short stories in various anthologies, as well. Her newest young adult novel, Throwback, will be published by Zando on April 11, 2023.

Her work has been critically-acclaimed and award-winning, receiving multiple starred reviews from Publishers Weekly, Kirkus, School Library Journal, and Booklist, been placed on many school, library, and state reading lists and has appeared on several “Best Book” lists, including NPR (2017, 2018), Cosmo (2019), The Boston Globe (2018), The New York Public Library (2017, 2018) and The Los Angeles Public Library (2013). She is the recipient of the California Library Association’s John and Patricia Beatty Award and a finalist for the California Book Award.

Works 
Young Adult Novels

 Since You Asked (Scholastic, 2013)
 I Believe in a Thing Called Love (Farrar, Straus and Giroux, 2017)
 The Way You Make Me Feel (Farrar, Straus and Giroux, 2018)
 Somewhere Only We Know (Farrar, Straus and Giroux, 2019)
 Throwback (Zando, 2023)

Short Stories

 in Our Stories, Our Voices: 21 YA Authors Get Real About Injustice, Empowerment, and Growing Up Female in America (Simon Pulse, 2018)
 in Come On In (Inkyard Press, 2020)
 in Up All Night (Algonquin, 2021)
Comics series

 Silk (Marvel Comics, 2020), illustrated by Takeshi Miyazawa

References

External links

Living people
21st-century American novelists
Year of birth missing (living people)
University of San Diego alumni
Emerson College alumni
Writers from Glendale, California